Quicombo is a town and commune of Angola, located in the province of Cuanza Sul.

See also 
 Communes of Angola

References 

Cuanza Sul Province